Methodius or Methodios may refer to:

 Methodius of Olympus (d. 311), Christian bishop, church father, and martyr
Apocalypse of Pseudo-Methodius, a seventh-century text purporting to be written by Methodius of Olympus
 Methodios I of Constantinople (c. 790–847), patriarch of Constantinople
 Saint Methodius of Thessaloniki (826–885), Byzantine Greek archbishop of Moravia and scholar, associated with Cyril
 Methodius II of Constantinople, Ecumenical Patriarch in 1240
 Methodius III of Constantinople, Ecumenical Patriarch in 1668–1671
 Methodios Anthrakites (1660–1736), Greek scholar, priest and director of the Gioumeios and Epiphaneios Schools in Ioannina
 Metodyj Trochanovskij (1885–1947), Polish activist
 Metropolitan Methodios (Tournas) of Boston (born 1946), the spiritual leader of the Greek Orthodox Metropolis of Boston
 Methodius Buslaev, fictional character from Dmitri Yemets's book series
 St. Methodios Faith and Heritage Center, a camp run by the Greek Orthodox Metropolis of Boston located in the town of Hopkinton, New Hampshire, United States
 Methodius, Berat's archbishop, who renovated the Ardenica Monastery in 1743